Vipul Krishna (born 9 February 2001) is an Indian cricketer. He made his List A debut on 10 October 2019, for Bihar in the 2019–20 Vijay Hazare Trophy. He made his Twenty20 debut on 8 November 2019, for Bihar in the 2019–20 Syed Mushtaq Ali Trophy.

References

External links
 

2001 births
Living people
Indian cricketers
Bihar cricketers
Place of birth missing (living people)